Max Oskar Robert Quarg (September 15, 1887 - July 17, 1969) was a German athlete, who competed at the 1908 Summer Olympics in London. In the 800 metres, Quarg placed fourth in his semifinal heat and did not advance to the final.  His time was 2:10.0.

References

Sources
 
 
 
 DGLD profile
 Oskar Quarg's profile at Sports Reference.com

1887 births
1969 deaths
Athletes (track and field) at the 1908 Summer Olympics
Olympic athletes of Germany
German male middle-distance runners